Salinas City Elementary is an elementary school district located in Salinas, California. As of 2015, Salinas City Elementary had an enrollment of about 9,000 students, of which 80% were Hispanic or Latino. Salinas City Elementary has 13 campuses and employs ~800 classified and certificated employees, making the district one of the largest employers in Salinas, CA.

Salinas City Elementary School District is one of 96 California school districts  that has advanced to the federal Title I Program Improvement (PI) Year 3 status based upon failure to make Adequate Yearly Progress (AYP) for at least five years and is now subject to corrective action and targeted technical assistance as specified by the federal law.

Demographics

*
Source: California State Board of Education, 2005-2006

Foundation 
The Salinas City Elementary School Education Foundation was founded in 2005 by concerned 
community members with the purpose of raising funds to provide Salinas City Elementary 
students with music, technology and art education because the State of California's budgeting had 
eliminated these opportunities.

Board of trustees

Regular Meeting Times: Second Monday of the month, 840 S. Main St., Salinas.

Campuses

References

External links
 
 Monterey County Office of Education

School districts in Monterey County, California
Education in Salinas, California